St John's College is one of the higher educational institutions of the Syro-Malankara Catholic Church. The college is situated at Anchal, Kerala, India. It is one of the Malankara Syrian Catholic colleges established and administered by the Major Archdiocese of Trivandrum in accordance with the rights of the minority community guaranteed in the Constitution of India. The college was founded by Archbishop Benedict Mar Gregorios and is supported by the patronage of Moran Mor Baselios Cleemis. The college is re-accredited by NAAC with A grade in May 2015. It is the third college in Kollam district to receive an A grade.

The College, affiliated to the University of Kerala, was started in 1964 with pre-degree course and upgraded successively with B.A, B.Sc and B.Com Degree courses in 1967, M.Sc Mathematics in 1995, B.A. Communicative English (Semester) in 1998, M.A. Public Administration (Semester) in 1999, and M.Sc Environmental Science (Semester) in 2001.
On 13 September 2014, the college celebrated its Golden Jubilee.

Programmes offered 

 B.A. Communicative English
 B.A. Economics
 B.A. Malayalam
 B.A. Political Science
 B.Com
 B.Sc. Botany
 B.Sc. Chemistry
 B.Sc. Mathematics
 B.Sc. Physics
 B.Sc. Zoology
 M.A. Public Administration
 M.Sc. Chemistry
 M.Sc. Environmental Science
 M.Sc. Mathematics

Notable alumni
 B. Kemal Pasha, justice of the high court of Kerala

References 

 Handbook, St John's College, Anchal, 2013-2015

External Links
 Official website
 Facebook

Syro-Malankara Catholic Church
Catholic universities and colleges in India
Arts and Science colleges in Kerala
Colleges affiliated to the University of Kerala
Universities and colleges in Kollam district
Educational institutions established in 1964
1964 establishments in Kerala